The 1st Emmy Awards, retroactively known as the 1st Primetime Emmy Awards after the debut of the counterpart Daytime Emmy Awards, were presented at the Hollywood Athletic Club in Los Angeles on Tuesday, January 25, 1949. Only shows produced in Los Angeles County, California and aired in the Los Angeles media market were eligible to win. The awards were hosted by Walter O'Keefe who substituted for Rudy Vallée when he had to leave town at the last minute. A special award category was introduced and awarded to Louis McManus for designing the actual Emmy Award statuette.

Winners and nominees
Winners are listed first, highlighted in boldface, and indicated with a double dagger (‡).

Programs

Hosting

Station Award
 KTLA for Outstanding Overall Performance in 1948

Special Award
 Louis McManus – for designing the Emmy Award statuette.
McManus was presented with a plaque as an award instead of a copy of the very statue which he was being honored for.

Technical Award
 Charles Mesak of Don Lee Television for the introduction of TV camera technology Phasefader

References

External links
 Emmys.com list of 1949 Nominees & Winners
 

001
Emmy Awards
Primetime Emmy Awards
Primetime Emmy Awards
Primetime Emmy Awards